Soufflé is an open source parallel logic programming language, influenced by Datalog. Soufflé includes both an interpreter and a compiler that targets parallel C++. Soufflé has been used to build static analyzers, disassemblers, and tools for binary reverse engineering. Soufflé is considered by academic researchers to be high-performance and "state of the art," and is often used in benchmarks in academic papers.

Programming examples 
Given a set of edges in a graph, the following program computes the set of (directed) paths between any two nodes. This is also known as the transitive closure of the edge relation.

.decl edge(x:number, y:number)
.input edge

.decl path(x:number, y:number)
.output path

path(x, y) :- edge(x, y).
path(x, y) :- path(x, z), edge(z, y).

Features 
 An interpreter and a compiler that targets parallel C++ (C++ that uses OpenMP). Both the interpreter and compiler use semi-naïve evaluation.
 Stratified negation
 Aggregation
 Automatic index selection
 Specialized parallel data structures, including disjoint-sets,  B-trees, and tries.
 Static typing
 Records and algebraic data types
 A foreign function interface

Related tools 
In addition to a compiler and an interpreter, the Soufflé project also publishes:

 a profiler,
 a "provenance"-based debugger,
 an "auto-scheduler" (also called a "join optimizer") that chooses efficient query plans based on a profile, as in profile-guided optimization.

Applications 

Soufflé has been used to build static analyzers, including:

 A pointer analysis for Java
 A control-flow analysis for Scheme 
 Various analyses for smart contract languages 

It has also been used to build tools for binary analysis, including reverse engineering, and disassemblers.

References

Sources

External links 
 Project homepage
 

Logic programming languages
High-level programming languages